Johannes Christiaan de Marez Oyens (21 January 1845, Amsterdam – 11 August 1911, Partenkirchen) was a Dutch politician.

1845 births
1911 deaths
Ministers of Transport and Water Management of the Netherlands
Members of the Senate (Netherlands)
Anti-Revolutionary Party politicians
Politicians from Amsterdam